Elizabeth Dorothy Craig (born 1967) is a New Zealand politician and Member of Parliament in the House of Representatives for the Labour Party. As a public health physician, she has become known for her research work on child poverty.

Early life and family
Craig was born in 1967 and received her secondary education at Spotswood College in New Plymouth. She left New Plymouth at the age of 18 to attend medical school in Auckland. She was married to David Craig for 27 years, with whom she has two children. In January 2020 she married Philip Melgren.

For the 2014 election, the family split its time between Dunedin and Romahapa in The Catlins. In 2016, when her selection for the Invercargill electorate was confirmed, she started looking for a house in Invercargill and has lived there since.

Public health career
Craig is a public health doctor and child poverty advocate. In 2009, she won a $50,000 Dunedin School of Medicine's research development investment award, and she established a child and youth health policy research unit with that funding. She was the director of the New Zealand Child and Youth Epidemiology Service of the University of Otago. In 2012, she warned that New Zealanders had to get used to poor children suffering from Third World diseases. Craig resigned as director from the research group, and as editor of the child poverty monitor, prior to the 2014 election.

Political career

Craig stressed that her political views were formed through her work on child poverty, and "not the other way around". She joined the Labour Party in 2010 and was a contributing author of Labour's children's policies for the 2011 and 2014 elections. Ranked 32 on the Labour list, she was not returned on the list either. 

Craig was placed 31 on Labour's party list. Craig lost the electorate to incumbent Sarah Dowie, but entered parliament via the Party list. In her first term, she was a member of the health, environment and regulations review committees.

During the 2020 election, Craig contested the Invercargill electorate but lost to National candidate Penny Simmonds by 224 votes. Craig had trailed by 685 votes in the preliminary results, causing speculation that she could win the seat when the special votes were counted. Despite this defeat, Craig was able to remain in Parliament via the Labour Party list.

Craig was chair of the health select committee from 2020 to 2022 when she was appointed the Parliamentary Private Secretary for Health. She is standing in Invercargill a third time in the 2023 New Zealand general election.

References

External links
 

1967 births
Living people
New Zealand Labour Party MPs
Members of the New Zealand House of Representatives
21st-century New Zealand women politicians
New Zealand list MPs
Women members of the New Zealand House of Representatives
Unsuccessful candidates in the 2014 New Zealand general election
Candidates in the 2017 New Zealand general election
Candidates in the 2020 New Zealand general election
People educated at Spotswood College